Aaron James Chapman (born 29 May 1990) is an English professional footballer who plays as a goalkeeper for Scunthorpe United.

Career

Chesterfield
Chapman signed for Chesterfield from nearby non-league side, Belper Town in the summer of 2013. He joined Chester on a one-month loan in February 2014. He made his professional debut on 2 September in the Football League Trophy match against Scunthorpe United, after coming off the bench to replace Tommy Lee in the seventh minute. On 23 September 2014, Chapman joined Accrington Stanley on a two-month loan deal. On 11 October, he had to be substituted in the closing stages of Accrington Stanley's 2–1 home defeat to Dagenham & Redbridge following an injury to his left foot. His loan spell was cut short and he returned to Chesterfield on 13 October, having played three games for Accrington. On 14 August 2015, Chapman joined Bristol Rovers on a one-month loan deal.

Accrington Stanley
In summer 2016, Chapman joined Accrington Stanley on a two-year contract. In an EFL Cup tie against Bradford City on 9 August 2016, Chapman came on as a substitute after Elliot Parish was sent off. The game went to a penalty shootout which Stanley won 11–10 and Chapman took and scored a penalty.
Accrington Stanley won the League Two title in 2017–18, with Chapman also winning the League Two Golden Glove award, having kept 18 clean sheets in 45 league games.  At the end of the 2017–18 season, he was offered a new contract by Accrington.

Peterborough United
On 15 May 2018, Chapman joined Peterborough United on a two-year deal to challenge the number 1 Jersey. He was transfer-listed by Peterborough United at the end of the 2018–19 season.

On 14 December 2019, Chapman joined Tranmere Rovers on a one-week emergency loan.

On 12 June 2020, Chapman was released by Peterborough, after playing 39 games for the club.

Motherwell
On 7 October 2020, Chapman was announced as a new signing by Scottish Premiership club Motherwell, with manager Stephen Robinson describing him as being "experienced cover and competition to Trevor" (Carson). He was released by the club at the end of the 2020–21 season.

Gillingham
On 6 July 2021, Chapman returned to England to join League One side Gillingham following his release from Motherwell. Chapman was released by the club following relegation to League Two at the end of the 2021–22 season.

Stevenage
On 23 May 2022, Chapman signed for League Two side Stevenage, playing under Steve Evans for a third time in the career with the manager having signed him at both Peterborough United and Gillingham.

Scunthorpe United
On 6 February 2023, Chapman signed for National League side Scunthorpe United after finding limited opportunities to play in Steve Evans' Stevenage side.

Personal life
On 2 April 2018, Chapman was involved in a car accident prior to Accrington's match against Notts County, and was taken to hospital as a result.

Career statistics

Honours 
Accrington Stanley
 EFL League Two: 2017–18

Individual
 EFL Golden Glove: League Two 2017–18

References

External links
 

1990 births
Living people
Footballers from Birmingham, West Midlands
English footballers
Association football goalkeepers
Chesterfield F.C. players
Belper Town F.C. players
Chester F.C. players
Accrington Stanley F.C. players
Bristol Rovers F.C. players
Peterborough United F.C. players
Tranmere Rovers F.C. players
Motherwell F.C. players
Gillingham F.C. players
Stevenage F.C. players
Scunthorpe United F.C. players
Northern Premier League players
National League (English football) players
English Football League players
Scottish Professional Football League players
Black British sportsmen